Gunn Yang (born 30 September 1993) is a South Korean professional golfer. In 2014, he won the U.S. Amateur, defeating Corey Conners, 2&1, in the final round of the championship at Atlanta Athletic Club. He became the second South Korean to claim the U.S. Amateur title. He made his PGA Tour debut at the Farmers Insurance Open in February 2015 and also competed in Arnold Palmer Invitational, RBC Heritage, and The Masters. Yang made his first cut on the PGA Tour at the Crowne Plaza Invitational, where he was T-15th after 2nd round, but finished as T-65th. He competed in his first major championship in 2015, competing in the Masters Tournament and was cut after the second round.

Yang played on the European Challenge Tour in 2017. He missed the cut in every tournament he played in 2017 and 2018. As of 30 October 2018, he last played in the 2018 Sony Open in Hawaii.

Amateur wins (1)
2014 U.S. Amateur

Results in major championships

CUT = missed the half-way cut
"T" = tied

References

External links

South Korean male golfers
San Diego State Aztecs men's golfers
Sportspeople from Gangwon Province, South Korea
1993 births
Living people